St. Ignatius of Loyola College (also abbreviated as CSIL), is a private Catholic secondary school, located in Kasait, Ulmera, Liquiça, Timor Leste. The school was founded by the Timor - Leste Region of the Society of Jesus in 2013 near the capital city of Dili, with its first intake of students, in Year 7. The school aims to form young East Timorese to become men and women of intellectual competence, religious with conscience, and humanly compassionate toward their fellow human beings. The school was officially inaugurated on 25 January 2014.

As a Jesuit school, St. Ignatius of Loyola College's philosophy is to promote the spiritual, academic, social, emotional, psychological and physical development of its students.

In 2018 the school had 693 students and 36 qualified teachers.

See also

 Catholic Church in East Timor
 List of Jesuit schools

References  

Jesuit secondary schools in Asia
Educational institutions established in 2013
Catholic Church in East Timor
2013 establishments in East Timor
Schools in East Timor